Ons Jabeur was the defending champion, but chose to participate in Poitiers instead.

Julie Coin won the tournament, defeating Jovana Jakšić in the final, 7–5, 6–3.

Seeds

Main draw

Finals

Top half

Bottom half

References 
 Main draw

Challenger Banque Nationale de Saguenay
Challenger de Saguenay